The Canadian Music Hall of Fame was established in 1978 by the Canadian Academy of Recording Arts and Sciences (CARAS) to honour Canadian musicians for their lifetime achievements in music. The award presentation is held each year as part of the Juno Award ceremonies. Since 2012, the inductee also performs at the ceremony.

A hall facility was opened in Calgary in 2016 located within The National Music Centre in Calgary, Alberta. It can be found on level five of the Studio Bell, a floor entirely dedicated to celebrating and recognizing Canadian music creators and artists who have left their mark on this country and beyond.

Inductees
As of 2023 CARAS has honoured 64 bands or individual musicians. To date, Randy Bachman and Burton Cummings are the only artists to be inducted twice, once for their work with The Guess Who and again for Bachman's work with Bachman–Turner Overdrive and Cummings for his solo work.

2023

2022

2021

2019

2018

2017

2016

2015

2014

2013

2012

2011

2010

2009

2008

2007

2006

2005

2004

2003

2002

2001

2000

1999

1998

1997

1996

1995

1994

1993

1992

1991

1990

1989

1987

1986

1985

1984

1983

1982

1981

1980

1979

1978

See also

Music of Canada
 List of music museums

References

External links
 Official Website
 Juno Awards - Canadian Music Hall of Fame

Awards established in 1978
Music organizations based in Canada

Canadian music mass media
Canadian music awards

Halls of fame in Canada
Music halls of fame
Lifetime achievement awards
1978 establishments in Canada